Tarkówek  is a village in the administrative district of Gmina Przesmyki, within Siedlce County, Masovian Voivodeship, in east-central Poland. The town was administratively part of the Siedlce province .

References

Villages in Siedlce County